The superb sunbird (Cinnyris superbus) is a species of bird in the family Nectariniidae.
It is widely spread across the African tropical rainforest.

References

superb sunbird
Birds of the African tropical rainforest
superb sunbird
Taxonomy articles created by Polbot